Irven Robertshaw (26 November 1883 – 1970) was a British gymnast. He competed in the men's team all-around event at the 1908 Summer Olympics.

References

External links
 

1883 births
1970 deaths
British male artistic gymnasts
Olympic gymnasts of Great Britain
Gymnasts at the 1908 Summer Olympics
Sportspeople from Bradford
20th-century British people